Merz may refer to:

 Merz (art style), a synonym for the more common term Dada
 Merz (musician), a British electro-folk singer
 Merz (surname)
 Merz Apothecary, a historic German health care store in Chicago
 Merz & McLellan, a British electrical engineering consultancy
 Merz Peninsula, Palmer Land, Antarctica
 Merz Pharma, an international health care company

See also
 
 

 Mers (disambiguation)
 Mertz, a surname
 MRZ (disambiguation)
 Murs (disambiguation)